Halman may refer to:

Boats
Halman 20, a Canadian sailboat design

Places
 Halman, Iran, a village in Kermanshah Province, Iran

People